Giambattista Palma (died 1594) was a Roman Catholic prelate who served as Bishop of Massa Lubrense (1560–1577).

Biography
In 1581, Giambattista Palma was appointed during the papacy of Pope Gregory XIII as Bishop of Massa Lubrense. He served as Bishop of Massa Lubrense until his death in 1594.

References

External links and additional sources
 (for Chronology of Bishops) 
 (for Chronology of Bishops) 

1594 deaths
16th-century Italian Roman Catholic bishops
Bishops appointed by Pope Gregory XIII